The Chapman House, also known as the Chapman Residence, in Syracuse, New York was built in 1912.  Along with other Ward Wellington Ward-designed homes, it was listed on the National Register of Historic Places in 1997.

It shows Colonial Revival and Arts and Crafts elements, and is located at the corner of Danforth and Park, two blocks from North Salina Street.

The nearby Gang House was also designed by Ward.

References

Houses in Syracuse, New York
National Register of Historic Places in Syracuse, New York
Houses on the National Register of Historic Places in New York (state)
Houses completed in 1912